Royal Blood is a BBC Books original novel written by Una McCormack and based on the long-running British science fiction television series Doctor Who. It features the Twelfth Doctor and Clara Oswald. The book was released on 10 September 2015 as a part of The Glamour Chronicles, alongside Big Bang Generation and Deep Time.

Audiobook 

An unabridged audiobook version of Royal Blood was released on 5 November 2015. It was read by David Warner who played Professor Grisenko in the Doctor Who episode "Cold War".

References

External links 
 
 

2015 British novels
2015 science fiction novels
New Series Adventures
Twelfth Doctor novels